Operation Title was an unsuccessful Allied attack on the German battleship Tirpitz during World War II. It involved two British Chariot manned torpedos that were transported to near the battleship's anchorage in Trondheim Fjord, Norway, by a Norwegian trawler between 26 and 31 October 1942. 

Both Chariots were lost due to bad weather on 31 October, shortly before the attack was to have begun. This caused the operation to be abandoned. The Allied personnel attempted to escape overland to neutral Sweden. All but one of them reached Sweden by 5 November, with the other – a British serviceman – being murdered after being taken prisoner by German forces.

Background
The navy's commander, Grand Admiral Erich Raeder, believed that battleships and cruisers were a key part of this strategy. As a result, the Scharnhorst and Bismarck-class battleships that were constructed in the late 1930s and early 1940s were designed to be capable of making long range anti-shipping raids into the Atlantic Ocean. Tirpitz was the second of the two Bismarck-class vessels and was launched in April 1939 and commissioned on 25 February 1941.

The  made two battleship raids against Allied convoys in the Atlantic Ocean during early 1941. The battleships  and  conducted Operation Berlin between January and March 1941. During this raid, they sailed from Germany, attacked Allied shipping and returned to occupied France. A second raid, Operation Rheinübung, was attempted in May and involved the battleship Bismarck and heavy cruiser Prinz Eugen. While the German ships destroyed the British battlecruiser HMS Hood on 24 May, Bismarck was crippled by Fairey Swordfish torpedo bombers from the British aircraft carrier  and sank on 27 May after being bombarded by several British battleships from the Home Fleet. The loss of Bismarck left Tirpitz as Germany's only full-sized battleship.

After the German invasion of the Soviet Union on 22 June 1941 the Allies began sending convoys loaded with supplies through the Norwegian Sea and Arctic Ocean to ports in northern Russia. The Arctic convoys that were dispatched during 1941 and early 1942 were lightly opposed. Harsh weather conditions, including extreme cold, heavy seas and gales, made air and naval operations in the area difficult for all of the combatants.

In December 1941 the German military began transferring substantial naval and air forces to northern Norway, which they had occupied since early 1940. The forces sent to Norway were tasked with attacking the Arctic convoys as well as defending the area from an invasion. At this time the German dictator Adolf Hitler wrongly believed the Allies intended to invade Norway. On 12 January 1942 Hitler ordered Tirpitz to be transferred from Germany to Fættenfjord in Norway, which is located near the city of Trondheim. The battleship and two escorting destroyers departed Wilhelmshaven in Germany on 14 January and arrived in Trondheim on 16 January. She was to form the main element of a powerful battle group once other German warships arrived in the area.  Karl Topp commanded Tirpitz at this time.

The Allies learned of Tirpitzs arrival at Trondheim on 17 January from Ultra intelligence obtained by decrypting intercepted German radio signals. British photo reconnaissance aircraft located the battleship there on 23 January, and regular sorties were flown over the Trondheim area to monitor her. Due to the threat Tirpitz posed to Allied convoys in the Atlantic Ocean and the Norwegian Sea, British Prime Minister Winston Churchill directed on 25 January that "the destruction or even crippling of this ship is the greatest event at sea at the present time. No other target is comparable to it". A force of 16 Royal Air Force (RAF) heavy bombers attacked Tirpitz at Fættenfjord on the night of 28/29 January but did not inflict any damage.

On 6 March 1942, Tirpitz and three escorting destroyers departed Fættenfjord to attack two Allied convoys that were passing through the Norwegian Sea. These convoys were escorted by elements of the British Home Fleet, and planes operating from the aircraft carrier  made an unsuccessful attack on Tirpitz on 9 March. Following this operation Hitler directed that Tirpitz was to not attempt further attacks against convoys unless it was confirmed that no aircraft carriers were nearby.

The RAF repeatedly attacked Tirpitz at Fættenfjord during March and April 1942. Raids were conducted using heavy bombers on the nights of 30/31 March, 27/28 April and 28/29 April. None caused any damage to the battleship, and 12 British aircraft were destroyed. These raids had to be conducted at night as the German air defences in the region made daytime attacks too risky. The lengthening duration of daylight as spring wore on led to a decision to not make further heavy bomber attacks until autumn.

On 2 July 1942 Tirpitz and several other German warships sailed from Fættenfjord to Altenfjord in northern Norway to be held ready to attack Convoy PQ-17. The head of the Royal Navy, Admiral of the Fleet Dudley Pound, ordered the ships sailing in the convoy to scatter and proceed to the USSR individually after learning of the German force's presence. Tirpitz sortied on 5 July, but was ordered to return to Narvik the next day by Hitler after a British aircraft carrier was detected. German aircraft and submarines inflicted heavy losses on the ships that had sailed with PQ-17; 24 were destroyed.

Prelude

Chariot manned torpedoes
 
The destruction of Convoy PQ-17 led to an increased determination among the Allied leadership to neutralise Tirpitz. As the RAF raids had failed, the Admiralty (the agency which oversaw the Royal Navy) came to believe that attacks against the battleship at its anchorage using small submarines should be attempted. It was not possible to use full sized submarines as the shallow depth of Fættenfjord meant that they would likely be detected before an attack could be made.

At this time the Royal Navy had two types of small submarines under development, the Chariot manned torpedo and the X-class midget submarines. Development of both types for the Royal Navy began during 1940. Manned torpedoes were used by the Italian Regia Marina to damage three British battleships while at anchor at their base in Alexandria, Egypt on 19 December 1941. Following this attack Churchill asked the Chiefs of Staff Committee to explain "what is being done to emulate the exploits of the Italians in Alexandria Harbour". By the start of February 1942 the commander of the Royal Navy's submarine service, Rear Admiral Max Horton, was developing plans to use manned torpedoes and midget submarines.

Trials of the first Chariot manned torpedo began in April 1942. Volunteers to operate Chariots and midget submarines were also sought in early 1942. The appeal issued by Horton noted that the volunteers would undertake "hazardous service" but did not specify what would be involved to preserve secrecy. By April 1942, 30 men had been recruited.

The Chariot had a crew of two, a commander and a number two. The craft were armed with a single detachable warhead containing  of explosives. It was intended that Chariots would be transported to near their target by ship. The crew would then penetrate the enemy defences, which were expected to include metal anti-submarine and anti-torpedo nets. Once done, the number two would attach the warhead to the target ship's hull using magnets. The crew would then attempt to escape; as the Chariot did not have enough range to return to its mother ship, it was intended they would head for the shore and travel overland to a neutral country. Extensive trials and other developmental work were conducted during 1942 to perfect the Chariot's design and develop tactics for using them in combat. The crews were also put through gruelling training to prepare them to make attacks and escape overland; despite the difficulty of the training and the obviously risky nature of the Chariot's intended missions, few of the volunteers withdrew.

Plans

Work on a plan to attack Tirpitz at Fættenfjord using Chariots began in mid-June 1942. The plan was developed by Captain Edward Gibson (who was also the Baron Ashbourne) and the head of the Norwegian Section of the Special Operations Executive (SOE), Lieutenant Colonel John Wilson. The SOE was a covert British service responsible for sabotage attacks in occupied Europe. It was realised at an early stage of planning that the Norwegian resistance would also need to be involved.

Consideration was given to inserting the Chariots into the target area by air. One proposal involved the craft and their crews being dropped from Handley Page Halifax bombers, but this was ruled out due to the difficultly of the crew being able to locate their Chariot after being parachuted into the sea at night. Another proposal involved using Short Sunderland flying boats to land the craft, and five of the aircraft were modified for this purpose. The Sunderland proposal was later abandoned as it was judged unlikely that these large aircraft would be able to reach Fættenfjord without being detected.

The final plan involved transporting the Chariots and their crews by sea to the island of Frøya to the west of Trondheimsfjorden. The Chariots would then be attached below the waterline of a boat provided by members of the Norwegian resistance, which was to bluff its way through the German defences of Trondheimsfjorden and sail to the island of Tautra to the north of Fættenfjord. The crews would board the Chariots near Tautra and make the attack against Tirpitz. This plan was approved on 26 June by Admiral Pound. The attack was designated Operation Title, and it was scheduled to take place in October 1942.

Attack

Preparations

Following Pound's approval of the plan, contact was made with the resistance in Trondheim through a Norwegian diplomat stationed in Sweden. The resistance agent Arne Christiansen travelled to Trondheim to seek assistance from a resistance network there. The local resistance personnel were asked to provide information about German security measures in the area and how they could be evaded. Christiansen also attempted to recruit a fishing boat captain at Frøya who was willing to transport the Chariots.

In the meantime, the personnel of the British Chariot force continued training at Loch Cairnbawn in Scotland. In late August seven Chariots made a mock attack against the British battleship . The battleship was moored near the shore of the loch and protected by two layers of nets and a patrol boat. Four of the seven teams planted warheads on the battleship, and another mock attack next night involving four teams was successful. While one of the Chariot crew members died as a result of an accident during a third mock attack, the exercise demonstrated that the force was ready for combat.

Tirpitz remained at Bogen Bay near Narvik following the operation against Convoy PQ-17. In September it was decided to return her to Fættenfjord to undertake maintenance. During the period Tirpitz was at Narvik the British judged that she would return to Fættenfjord as the anti-aircraft batteries there remained in place.

Christiansen was unable to persuade any fishermen at Frøya to provide a boat. One man who he approached declined to cooperate due to the likelihood of Germans retaliating against his family if his role became known. Lieutenant Colonel Wilson decided to use ships and personnel from the Shetland Bus force instead; these ships transported personnel and supplies between Norway and the UK. The highly experienced Shetland Bus captain Leif Larsen agreed to take part and recruited a crew of three. These were the engineer Palmer Bjørnøy, deckhand Kohannes Kalve and radio operator Roald Strand. Larsen was unable to disclose the nature of the operation, but warned the men that it would likely cost their lives.

Larsen selected his boat, the Arthur, for the operation and she was modified to carry two Chariots. The craft were to be transported on her deck for the first part of the operation, and be towed underwater for the last  to Fættenfjord. Larsen personally installed two large eye bolts to the hull of the boat which the noses of the Chariots were to be attached via steel hawsers while they were towed underwater. A secret compartment was also added to hide the four Chariot crewmen and two support operators from any German personnel who inspected the boat in Norwegian waters. The Norwegian resistance provided information on the documentation Larsen would need to provide to enter Fættenfjord, as well as copies of some of these documents. Arthur was disguised as a similar boat known to be operating in Norway and its crew were issued with forged documents.

The final plan for the attack specified that Larsen was to scuttle Arthur after releasing the Chariots. The four Norwegians and two British support staff would then row to shore and hide in a hay truck. Members of the Norwegian resistance would collect Arthurs crew and the surviving Chariot operators and drive them to the Swedish border.

Two teams of Chariot operators were selected. One comprised Sub-Lieutenant William Brewster and Able Seaman A. Borwn. The other was manned by Sergeant Don Craig (a member of the British Army) and Able Seaman Bob Evans. The two other operators who travelled on board Arthur, Able Seamen Billy Tebb and Malcolm Causer, were to help the Chariot crews with their diving suits and serve as spare crewmen if needed. During the first week of October Arthur and the two Chariot teams made a final practice attack against the battleship . This was successful, with the Chariot teams cutting through the nets surrounding the battleship, attaching their charges and escaping undetected. The attack force then proceeded to Lunna House in the Shetland Islands to await orders to proceed.

Tirpitz returned to Fættenfjord on 23 October and was sighted there by a RAF photo reconnaissance aircraft the next day. On 25 October Admiral Horton ordered Operation Title to be initiated, with the attack being scheduled for the 31st of the month.

Voyage to Trondheimsfjorden

Arthur sailed on the morning of 26 October. After a voyage through rough seas, mountains near the village of Bud in Norway were sighted at midday on 28 October. The ship's engine broke down during the afternoon, forcing the crew to erect a sail while it was repaired. The engine was restarted in the late afternoon and Arthur proceeded to the island of Edøya. The cover story for the boat's voyage was that she was carrying a load of peat from the island. Edøya was reached during the morning of 29 October, and Arthurs crew anchored her there.

The plan for the operation called for the Chariots to be fitted with their warheads, unloaded from Arthur and secured to the boat while at Edøya. Attempts to do this during the morning were frustrated by several German aircraft which flew low to inspect the ship. All work had to be stopped each time and the British personnel needed to hide below deck. While the warheads were fitted to the Chariots after the German aircraft stopped patrolling, rough seas caused Arthur to drag her anchor. This made unloading the Chariots impossible, and the crew decided to find a better anchorage. This took the rest of the day.

Work to unload the Chariots resumed at 5 am on 30 October. Both Chariots were unloaded and secured to the bottom of Arthurs hull using ropes attached to cleats on the boat's deck. Arthur then resumed her voyage.

Before reaching Trondheimsfjorden, Larsen intended to visit the small town of Hestvik to meet with the storekeeper Nils Strøm who was to provide information on German activities in the region. During the voyage there Arthurs engine began to make loud knocking noises. Bjørnøy inspected the engine and found that a piston was damaged and needed to be urgently repaired. Arthur reached Hestvik at 11 pm that night, and Larsen directed Bjørnøy to repair the engine while he met with Strøm. The Norwegian shopkeeper provided information on German security procedures. Bjørnøy was unable to repair the engine as it transpired that the piston had cracked, meaning that it needed to be replaced or repaired with more sophisticated tools than were available on the boat. Strøm arranged for a trustworthy local blacksmith to be woken up, and he agreed to let Bjørnøy use his forge to repair the piston. After spending two hours working on the piston, Bjørnøy reassembled the engine and judged that it would last for long enough to get the boat to Fættenfjord.

Trondheimsfjorden

Arthur departed Hestvik to undertake the last stage of its voyage to Fættenfjord at 9 am on 31 October. As the waters between the town and Trondheimsfjorden were regularly patrolled by German security boats and it was expected that Arthur would be stopped for questioning, the British crew hid below decks with a machine gun at the ready. The Norwegians were armed with pistols. A German patrol boat was sighted at 10 am but did not stop Arthur.

The Norwegian boat was stopped for questioning by the German crew of an armed trawler as it entered Trondheimsfjorden, near the fortress at Agdenes. A German officer boarded Arthur, carefully inspected the crew's papers and questioned Larsen. He also briefly inspected the cargo of peat, but did not find the hidden British personnel or the Chariots. Arthur was then given permission to proceed into Trondheimsfjorden. The British personnel came up on deck briefly, and then began the slow process of dressing the attack crews in their diving suits. Craig and Evans were the first to be dressed, followed by Brewster and Brown.

As the British personnel were dressed, Arthur began to encounter rough seas which turned into a storm. This caused the Chariots to sway and collide with the hull of the boat. Larsen slowed Arthur to reduce the Chariots' motion, but was unable to stop the boat as it would have been inspected again by the Germans. He was hopeful that the storm would quickly end, as was common. As Brewster and Brown completed dressing, they heard what Brewster described as a "loud, grinding tearing noise". The boat then shook, and it appeared that something had fouled its propeller. It was thought that one of the Chariots had broken free, and Larsen steered Arthur close to the shore to find a patch of calm water. Evans then went into the water, and discovered that both Chariots were gone. At the time Arthur was only  from Tirpitz.

Escape

The loss of the Chariots forced the abandonment of Operation Title. The original escape plan was now unviable, as it was twelve hours before the attack force was scheduled to meet up with the local resistance. It was not possible to scuttle Arthur near the shore as this would probably be seen by the Germans, and Bjørnøy advised that the engine was about to fail again. Larsen proposed that the force proceed to the east along Trondheimsfjorden, find a secluded place to scuttle the boat and then attempt to reach the Swedish border. The British personnel agreed.

At about 1 am on 1 November Arthur was scuttled in the channel between Tatra and the Frosta peninsula. The exhausted Allied personnel rowed ashore, equipped only with maps, pistols and a small quantity of food. The Norwegians expected to be shot if they were captured, though the British were hopeful of being treated as prisoners of war as they were wearing military uniforms.

After coming ashore the party proceeded on foot to the east in a single group. Larsen ordered them to halt and rest after the sun rose. At midday they set off again, now split into two five-man groups. Larsen led one group, accompanied by Craig, Evans, Tebb and Strand. Brewster was the leader of the other group, which also comprised Brown, Causer, Kalve and Bjørnøy. Brewster's group was to follow the shore of Trondheimsfjorden while Larsen's was to take an inland route.

The group led by Larsen escaped detection during a difficult trip to near the Swedish border. As they approached the border they encountered a German military policeman accompanied by member of the collaborationist Norwegian Hirden force. The Allied personnel were arrested, but Tebb was able to pull out his concealed pistol shortly afterwards and opened fire. The German was killed and the Norwegian escaped. Evans was wounded in the incident, though sources differ on how badly. As the Allied personnel couldn't remain in the area due to the presence of German troops nearby, it was decided to leave Evans behind. It was believed that Evans would be treated as a prisoner of war as he was still wearing naval uniform. The remainder of Larsen's group made it across the border shortly afterwards, and surrendered to the Swedish police.

Brewster's group made good progress on 1 November, and sighted the German cruiser Admiral Scheer at her well disguised anchorage in Lofjord. They did not encounter any Germans other than a small group of sailors who were out for a walk, and slept in an abandoned hut that night. The next night they were given shelter and a meal by a Norwegian farmer. The night after they slept in a hunting cabin. Brewster's group crossed the Swedish border not long after Larsen's on 5 November and turned themselves in to a police station. Causer was suffering from frostbite and needed to be taken to hospital, and the other members of the group were in generally good health.

The nine Allied personnel who crossed into Sweden were held at a house for two days. They were then taken to an internment camp near Stockholm. After ten days there the men were handed over to the British embassy in Stockholm. They were flown back to the UK shortly afterwards. Larsen was awarded the Conspicuous Gallantry Medal and Brewster the Distinguished Service Cross.

After being scuttled Arthur settled on the floor of the fjord with its masts sticking out of the water. It was located by the Germans and raised. The Germans investigated the boat and, after discovering its secret compartments, correctly judged what its purpose had been.

Aftermath

Murder of Evans

Evans was taken prisoner soon after being left by Larsen's party and received medical treatment. He was then handed over to the head of the Gestapo in Trondheim, Gerhard Flesch. Flesch transferred Evans to senior Kriegsmarine officers for questioning about the details of Operation Title. When this was completed the officers returned Evans to Flesch despite knowing that the Gestapo was likely to kill him. Evans was then taken to Oslo, where on 19 January 1943 he was shot as a saboteur.

The killing of Evans was one of the incidents for which Keitel and Flesch were separately prosecuted for after the war. Both were found guilty of war crimes, and executed.

Assessments

Historians regard Operation Title as a skilful but flawed attack. Writing in 1956, British official historian Stephen Roskill noted that the operation had been "most original and gallant, though unsuccessful". In 2012 Patrick Bishop judged that Tirpitz was "spared by a lucky change in weather and faulty workmanship". He has written that despite the "great ingenuity and technical skill" that were put into the plan and the risks taken by many Norwegians, it failed due to the faulty method used to fasten the Chariots to Arthur, and as a result "a great opportunity was squandered". In 2019 Angus Konstam wrote that if Arthur hadn't encountered the storm on 31 October "the course of the naval war might have been altered" and the attack had been a "very well-conceived and monumentally courageous operation" that nevertheless ended in failure.

Subsequent attacks

In September 1943 the Royal Navy mounted a second attack against Tirpitz using midget submarines. During Operation Source six X-class submarines were dispatched to attack the battleship and two other major German warships at their anchorage at Kaafjord in northern Norway. The attack was made on 22 September, and two of the midget submarine crews placed explosive charges below Tirpitz. These devices caused severe damage to the battleship. It was not possible to completely repair the damage, and Tirpitz was never fully operational again.

The Royal Navy's Fleet Air Arm made a series of attacks on Tirpitz during 1944. The first, Operation Tungsten, took place on 3 April 1944 as the repairs following Operation Source neared completion. Considerable damage was inflicted. The other attacks were not effective, with no damage to the battleship resulting from Operation Mascot on 17 July and the Operation Goodwood series of attacks in August achieving only superficial damage. Following the failure of Operation Goodwood the task of attacking the battleship was transferred to RAF Bomber Command. The first heavy bomber raid against Kaafjord (Operation Paravane) was conducted on 15 September 1944, with the bombers flying from staging bases in northern Russia. This attack inflicted irreparable damage on Tirpitz, and she was transferred south to the Tromsø area of Norway to be used as an immobile coastal defence battery. The battleship was sunk there with heavy loss of life by another Bomber Command raid on 12 November.

References

Citations

Works consulted

Further reading

 

Conflicts in 1942
1942 in Norway
World War II operations of the Western European Theatre
Arctic naval operations of World War II
Military operations of World War II involving Germany
Military history of Germany during World War II
Norwegian resistance movement
Naval battles and operations of World War II involving the United Kingdom
World War II raids
October 1942 events